The 1989 Florida State Seminoles baseball team represented Florida State University in the 1989 NCAA Division I baseball season. The Seminoles played their home games at Dick Howser Stadium. The team was coached by Mike Martin in his tenth season as head coach at Florida State.

The Seminoles reached the College World Series, their tenth appearance in Omaha, where they finished tied for third place after recording an opening round win against North Carolina, a second round win against eventual champion Wichita State and a pair of semifinal losses to Wichita State.

Personnel

Roster

Coaches

Schedule and results

References

Florida State Seminoles baseball seasons
Florida State Seminoles
College World Series seasons
Florida State Seminoles baseball